Lithium polonide is a chemical compound with the formula Li2Po. It is a polonide, a set of very chemically stable compounds of polonium.

Production
Lithium polonide may be produced from a redox reaction between aqueous hydrogen polonide and lithium metal or from an acid-base reaction of H2Po with strong lithium-containing bases:

H2Po + 2 Li → Li2Po + H2

It may also be produced by heating lithium and polonium together at 300–400 °C.

Crystal structure
Like sodium polonide, lithium polonide has the antifluorite structure.

References

Lithium compounds
Polonides
Fluorite crystal structure